Dichloroisoprenaline (DCI), also known as dichloroisoproterenol, was the first beta blocker ever to be developed. It is non-selective for the β1-adrenergic and β2-adrenergic receptors. DCI has low potency and acts as a partial agonist/antagonist at these receptors.

Although DCI was of no clinical value itself, further developments from DCI eventually led to the development of the clinical candidate pronethalol (withdrawn due to carcinogenicity) and subsequently propranolol (the first clinically successful beta blocker).

Dichloroisoprenaline is a racemic mixture of enantiomers.

References 

Beta blockers
Chloroarenes
Phenylethanolamines